The Sett Valley Trail is a  cycle- and bridleway in Derbyshire, England, linking the village of Hayfield and the town of New Mills (via Birch Vale, Thornsett and Ollersett). The line was purchased from British Rail by Derbyshire County Council in 1973. The station buildings at Hayfield were demolished in 1975; an information centre, picnic area, car park and toilets have now been built on the site. The Pennine Bridleway and Peak District Boundary Walk follow the section of the trail between Hayfield and Birch Vale.

References

External links
Guide to Sett Valley Trail for cycling with route photos

Footpaths in Derbyshire
Rail trails in England
High Peak, Derbyshire
New Mills